Robert Finch may refer to: 

 Robert Finch (American politician) (1925–1995), Republican politician from California
 Robert Finch (antiquarian) (1783–1830), English antiquary
 Robert Finch (Lord Mayor) (1944–2016), British politician and lawyer
 Robert Finch (nature writer) (born 1943), American nature writer and essayist
 Robert Finch (poet) (1900–1995), Canadian poet and academic
 Robert Finch (priest) (1724–1803), English divine
 Robert Finch (rugby league) (born 1955), Australian rugby league player
 Bob Finch (born 1954), British coal trader and businessman
 Bobby Finch (c. 1948–1978), English footballer

See also
 Finch (surname)